The 1920–21 Carnegie Tech Tartans men's ice hockey season was the 6th season of play for the program.

Season
After having remained dormant for a decade, Carnegie Tech revived its ice hockey program in 1920. They played two opponents twice each and as the team possessed very little experience with the game the team wasn't expected to win. They did, however, give Penn a challenge for the battle of Pennsylvania, pushing the Quakers into overtime in both games and earning a tie in their first match. With that surprising result, Carnegie Tech was looking forward to what a second season would bring.

Roster

Standings

Schedule and Results

|-
!colspan=12 style=";" | Regular Season

References

Carnegie Tech Tartans men's ice hockey seasons
Carnegie Tech
Carnegie Tech
Carnegie Tech
Carnegie Tech